Parotocinclus muriaensis is a species of catfish in the family Loricariidae. It is native to South America, where it occurs in the Paraíba do Sul basin in Brazil. The species reaches 3.1 cm (1.2 inches) SL.

References 

Loricariidae
Catfish of South America
Fish described in 2005
Otothyrinae